Odontoglossum odoratum, the fragrant odontoglossum, is a species of orchid ranging from Colombia to northern and northwestern Venezuela.

odoratum